Christophe Guénot (born 7 January 1979 in Saint-Rémy, Saône-et-Loire) is a French wrestler who won the Bronze medal in the Men's Greco-Roman 74kg in the 2008 Summer Olympics in Beijing.  He also competed at the 2012 Summer Olympics.

He is brother of the Olympic Champion Steeve Guenot.

References

External links
 http://pekin.franceolympique.com/pekin/athletes/6/guenot-10466.html
 
 
 
 
 

1979 births
Living people
People from Saint-Rémy, Saône-et-Loire
Olympic bronze medalists for France
Olympic wrestlers of France
Wrestlers at the 2008 Summer Olympics
Wrestlers at the 2012 Summer Olympics
Olympic medalists in wrestling
Medalists at the 2008 Summer Olympics
French male sport wrestlers
Mediterranean Games silver medalists for France
Mediterranean Games bronze medalists for France
Competitors at the 2005 Mediterranean Games
Competitors at the 2009 Mediterranean Games
Sportspeople from Saône-et-Loire
Mediterranean Games medalists in wrestling